Von Kármán is a large lunar impact crater that is located in the southern hemisphere on the far side of the Moon. Von Kármán is the site of the first soft-landing on the lunar far side by the Chinese Chang'e 4 spacecraft on 3 January 2019.

Overview

The northern third of this formation is overlain by the rim and outer rampart of the walled plain Leibnitz, forming a deep indentation in the formation. The remainder of the outer wall is roughly circular in shape, although it is irregular and heavily worn by subsequent impacts.

The interior of Von Kármán has been subjected to flooding by lava flows after the original crater formed, leaving the southern portion of the floor nearly flat. This surface has a lower albedo than the surrounding terrain, and is nearly as dark as the interior of Leibnitz. There is a central peak at the location where the midpoint of the original Von Kármán was formed, which joins with the rougher surface in the northern part of the crater.

In addition to Leibnitz to the north, the crater Oresme is located to the west-northwest, and Finsen lies to the northeast on the edge of Leibnitz's rim. Nearly attached to the southeast rim is the unusual figure-eight-shaped formation Von Kármán L. Directly to the east of this is the crater Alder.

Prior to formal naming in 1970 by the IAU, the crater was known as Crater 434.

Exploration

On 3 January 2019, the Chinese spacecraft Chang'e 4 landed inside the crater Von Kármán, becoming the first spacecraft to soft-land on the far side of the Moon.  The site has symbolic as well as scientific value. Theodore von Kármán (1881–1963) was the PhD advisor of Qian Xuesen, the founder of the Chinese space program.

On February 4, 2019, the IAU approved the name of the landing site as Statio Tianhe.  The central peak of Von Kármán, to the northwest of the landing site, was named Mons Tai.  Three small craters were also named: Hegu is south of the landing site, Zhinyu is to the west, and Tianjin is to the northeast.

Satellite craters
By convention these features are identified on lunar maps by placing the letter on the side of the crater midpoint that is closest to Von Kármán.

References

Bibliography

 
 
 
 
 
 
 
 
 
 
 
 

Impact craters on the Moon